Skyforger is a heavy metal band from Latvia which was formed in 1995 out of the remains of doom metal band Grindmaster Dead.

Musical style and lyrical themes 
Most of their songs are about Baltic mythology and warfare; they also play Latvian folk songs and their metal arrangements. Although Skyforger is known for their folk metal, the style on their demo  is essentially black metal. The band also has performed and recorded a number of folk songs, including the entirety of their acoustic fourth album , released in 2003. Folk elements can be found on all of their albums. In December 2005, during the presentation of their album, Semigalls' Warchant, the band announced their next album would be experimentation with thrash metal. They later pointed out that Latvian history still has enough untold stories, meaning their lyrics will retain their folk/pagan fashion.

History 
In 2010, Skyforger signed with American label Metal Blade Records and released their 5th studio album Kurbads about the deeds of mythical Latvian warrior , son of mare. The album received 2010 Annual Latvian Music Recording Award as the best rock album, as well as the 2010 Latvian Metal Music Award as the best metal album with Skyforger also winning the "Best Metal Band" category. Skyforger was featured on BBC's series "Close-Up" episode on Latvian folk music.

In 2015, the band released their 6th studio album titled  dedicated to the now extinct Baltic people Old Prussians. Two of the album's songs are sung in Old Prussian (Ei skīja, skīja and Rāmava), while the rest are in Latvian. For the writing of the album, Skyforger recruited historian Agris Dzenis as a historical consultant. After releasing the album, the band embarked on a European tour on April 8. In 2016, Senprūsija received the Annual Latvian Music Recording Award as the best hard rock/heavy metal album of 2015. In 2016, Skyforger also re-issued their 2003 album Zobena dziesma with 2 additional songs.

On June 3, 2017, Skyforger performed a one-time multi-media concert – metal opera "Kurbads. The Son of The Mare" – at Lielezers open-air stage in Limbaži as a part of a programme for 100th Anniversary of the Latvian Republic. On February 14, 2018, the performance was awarded Kilogram of Culture award as the "Surprise of the Year". On June 17, 2018, Skyforger played a special concert at the festival Zobens un Lemess commemorating the 20th anniversary since the release of their first full-length album  in 1998. On 18 November 2018, the centenary for the proclamation of Latvia, Skyforger released a video directed by Kristīne Neikena and starring actress  for their song Nekas nav aizmirsts from album Senprūsija.

Controversy
Skyforger was involved in some controversy with one of their former producers who believed they were affiliated with Neo-Nazism. The reason for this was the cover of their album Pērkoņkalve, which depicts Baltic god of thunder Pērkons wearing a belt buckle adorned with a swastika and striking an anvil, as well as the swastika incorporated in Skyforger's logo. Some websites had therefore listed Skyforger as a Neo-Nazi band. The band addressed the controversy on their website, writing:

Members
Current members
 – lead vocals, guitar, kokles, stabule (1995–present)
 ("Zirgs") – bass guitar, backing vocals, ģīga (1995–present)
Alvis Bernāns – guitar (2014–present)
Jānis Osis – drums, percussion (2022–present)

Former members
  – drums, backing vocals (1995–1998)
  – guitar, backing vocals (1996–2000, 2001–2004, 2006–2008)
  ("Mazais") – drums, percussion (1998–2015)
  – dūdas, kokles, backing vocals (2004–2012)
  – guitar, backing vocals (2000–2001, 2008–2010)
 Ģirts Kļaviņš ("Motors") – guitar, backing vocals (2004–2006)
 Egons Kronbergs – guitar (2010–2013)
 Artūrs Jurjāns – drums, percussion (2016–2022)

Timeline

Gallery

Discography
  (1997; demo)
  (1998)
  (2000)
 Pērkoņkalve (Thunderforge) (2003)
  (2003; acoustic album)
 Semigalls' Warchant (2005; expanded re-release)
 Zobena Dziesma (2006; expanded re-release)
 Kurbads (2010)
  (2015)
 Senprūsija Live (2015; live album)

References

External links

 
 Zobena dziesma 

Latvian heavy metal musical groups
Latvian black metal musical groups
Latvian folk metal musical groups
Latvian folk music groups
Metal Blade Records artists
Musical groups established in 1995